B'z The Best "Ultra Pleasure" is a compilation double-album by the Japanese hard rock duo B'z. It was released on June 18, 2008, and it is part of their 20th anniversary celebration. It peaked at #1 at Oricon charts and Billboard Japan Top Albums.

Track listing
All tracks by B'z

The First Run
 "Bad Communication" -Ultra Pleasure Style- – 6:20
 "Be There" – 4:13
 "Easy Come, Easy Go!" – 4:39
 "Lady Navigation" – 4:20
 "Alone" – 5:59
 "Zero" – 4:51
 "Itsuka no Merry Christmas" (いつかのメリークリスマス) – 5:37
 "Ai no mama ni Wagamama ni Boku wa Kimi dake o Kizutsukenai" (愛のままにわがままに 僕は君だけを傷つけない) – 3:56
 "Hadashi no Megami" (裸足の女神) – 4:26
 "Negai" (ねがい) – 3:29
 "Love Me, I Love You" – 3:19
 "Love Phantom" – 4:38
 "Mienai Chikara ~Invisible One~" (ミエナイチカラ 〜Invisible One〜) – 4:40
 "Calling" – 5:54
 "Samayoeru Aoi Dangan" (さまよえる蒼い弾丸) – 4:04

The Second Run
 "Home" – 4:20
 "Giri Giri Chop" (ギリギリchop) – 3:58
 "Kon'ya Tsuki no Mieru Oka ni" (今夜月の見える丘に) – 4:11
 "Juice" – 4:00
 "Ultra Soul" – 3:42
 "Atsuki Kodō no Hate" (熱き鼓動の果て) – 4:07
 "It's Showtime!!" – 3:59
 "Banzai" – 3:49
 "Ai no Bakudan" (愛のバクダン) – 4:25
 "Ocean" – 5:27
 "Shōdō" (衝動) – 3:14
 "Splash!" – 3:34
 "Eien no Tsubasa" (永遠の翼) – 5:08
 "Super Love Song" – 3:59
 "Pleasure 2008 ~Jinsei no Kairaku~" (Pleasure 2008 ～人生の快楽～) – 4:46

Personnel 
Tak Matsumoto (松本 孝弘) – producer, guitarist
Koshi Inaba (稲葉 浩志) – vocalist

Charts
Oricon Sales Chart (Japan)

DVD
 Itoshii Hitoyo Good Night… (愛しい人よGood Night...) [B'z Live-Gym Pleasure '92 "Time"]
 Mou Ichidou Kiss Shitakatta (もう一度キスしたかった) [B'z Live-Gym Pleasure '93 "Run"]
 Odekake Shimashou (おでかけしましょ) [B'z Live-Gym '94 "The 9th Blues -Part1-"]
 love me, I love you [B'z Live-Gym '96 "Spirit Loose"]
 Bad Communication [B'z Live-Gym Pleasure '97 "Fireball"]
 Calling [B'z Live-Gym '98 "Survive"]
 Love Phantom [B'z Live-Gym Pleasure 2000 "Juice"]
 Gold [B'z Live-Gym 2001 "Eleven"]
 Don't Leave Me [B'z Luve-Gym 2003 "Big Machine"]
 Samayoeru Aoi Dangan (さまよえる蒼い弾丸) [B'z Live-Gym 2005 "Circle of Rock"]

Certifications

References

External links
 B'z official website 
 B'z 20th anniversary special website  

B'z compilation albums
Being Inc. compilation albums
2008 compilation albums
2008 video albums
2008 live albums
Live video albums